The Roman Catholic Mission Sui Iuris of Tokelau (Latin: Missio Sui Iuris Tokelaunum) in Tokelau is a suffragan mission of the Roman Catholic Archdiocese of Samoa-Apia. It was formed in 1992 when the Archdiocese of Samoa-Apia and Tokelau was split into the Archdiocese of Samoa-Apia and the Mission Sui Iuris of Tokelau. The current Ecclesiastical Superior is Archbishop Alapati Lui Mata’eliga, appointed 22 December 2015.

History
From the discovery of the island by Europeans in 1841, several attempts were made by Catholic missionaries to reach Tokelau from Wallis Island between 1845 and 1863. The first Catholic baptism was performed in 1863 on one adult and three children, and several other occurred soon after. Father Didier lived in the country from 1883 to 1890, the year he died at sea. Two elders who were educated in Samoa acted as catechists starting in 1904, and others continued their role over time. The Catholic Church allowed traditional music and dance to be incorporated into Catholic religious ritual, contributing to their efforts at converting the populace.

In 1945 Father Jepson came to Tokelau and proposed having a priest permanently stationed there, a church be constructed, and the Order of Mary provide sisters to the island. Father Patrick O'Connor was the only foreigner residing in the country as of 2011. He was assigned to the island country by the Archbishop of Samoa in 1977 to take care of the Catholic parish on the atoll of Nukunonu and has resided there since then. The church services are conducted in Tokelau. The atoll of Nukunonu is mostly Catholic, while Fakaofo and Atafu atolls have both Congregational and Catholic churches. Many religious rules are followed such as families gathering at 6pm for prayers, a midnight curfew, and a ban on swimming on Sundays.

Ecclesiastical Superiors
Rev. Msgr. Patrick Edward O'Connor (1992–2011) 
Rev. Oliver Pugoy Aro, MSP (2011–2015)
Archbishop Alapati Lui Mata’eliga (2015-present)

See also
Nukunonu Church

References

External links 
 

Catholic Church in Tokelau
Tok
Tokelau
1992 establishments in Tokelau
Religious organisations based in Tokelau